Zone 51 is a zone of the municipality of Al Rayyan in the state of Qatar. The main districts recorded in the 2015 population census were Al Gharrafa, Gharrafat Al Rayyan, Izghawa, Bani Hajer, Al Seej, Rawdat Egdaim, and Al Themaid. 

Other districts which fall within its administrative boundaries are Rawdat Al Jahhaniya and Umm Al Afaei.

Demographics

Land use
The Ministry of Municipality and Environment (MME) breaks down land use in the zone as follows.

References 

Zones of Qatar
Al Rayyan